The 2022 Delaware Senate election were held on November 8, 2022, concurrently with the elections for the Delaware House of Representatives, to elect members to the Delaware General Assembly. All of the 21 seats in the Delaware Senate were up for election. The Democratic and Republican primaries were held on September 13, 2022.

The Democratic Party gained an additional seat vacated by Senator Ernesto Lopez (R), expanding their supermajority to 15-6.

Background

Predictions

Overview

Summary by district

Closest races 
Seats where the margin of victory was under 10%:
  gain

Retiring incumbents

Democrats 

 District 14: Bruce Ennis retired.

Republicans 

 District 6: Ernesto Lopez retired.

Incumbents defeated

In primary elections

Republicans 

 District 16: Colin Bonini lost renomination to Eric Buckson.

Detailed results

District 1 

The 1st district covers the northeastern tip of New Castle County along the Delaware River, including Claymont, Bellefonte, most of Edgemoor, and parts of northern Wilmington. First-term Democratic incumbent Sarah McBride, who was elected in 2020 with 73.3% of the vote, won a second term unopposed.

District 2 

The 2nd district is based in southern and eastern Wilmington along the Delaware River in New Castle County, also covering Minquadale and parts of New Castle and Edgemoor. First-term Democratic incumbent Darius Brown, who was unopposed in 2018, won a second term unopposed.

District 3 

The 3rd district is based in downtown Wilmington, also covering some unincorporated areas to the south. First-term Democratic incumbent Elizabeth Lockman, who was unopposed in 2018, won a second term unopposed.

District 4 

The 4th district covers many of Wilmington's northwestern suburbs in New Castle County, including Hockessin, Greenville, Pike Creek, Talleyville, Granogue, Brandywine, Alapocas, Montchanin, Runnymeade, Delaware Heights, Rockland, Winterthur, Wooddale, and other unincorporated areas. First-term Democratic incumbent Laura Sturgeon, who was elected in 2018 with 53.1% of the vote, won a second term.

District 5 

The 5th district covers the northern suburbs of Wilmington in New Castle County including Arden, Ardencroft, Ardentown, Windsor Hills, Naamans Manor, Wilmont, Talleys Corner, Afton, Shellburne, Windybush, Heatherbrooke, Chalfonte, and other unincorporated areas. First-term Democratic incumbent Kyle Evans Gay, who was elected in 2020 with 52.3% of the vote, won a second term.

District 6 

The 6th district is based in the Cape Region in coastal Sussex County, covering Rehoboth Beach, Lewes, Milton, and the surrounding communities. Three-term Republican incumbent Ernesto Lopez, who was re-elected in 2018 with 52.6% of the vote, announced in July 2022, that he would not run for re-election. Democrat Russ Huxtable went on to flip the seat in the general election.

Democratic primary

General election

District 7 

The 7th district covers the immediate western suburbs of Wilmington in New Castle County, including Elsmere, Newport, Westminster, Anglesey, and other unincorporated areas. First-term Democratic incumbent Spiros Mantzavinos, who was elected in 2020 with 51.4% of the vote, won a second term.

District 8 

The 8th district is based in Newark – the state's third-largest city – and also covers parts of Hockessin and North Star. Ten-term Democratic incumbent David Sokola, who was unopposed in 2020, is won an eleventh term.

District 9 

The 9th district covers the areas between Newark and Wilmington in New Castle County, including parts of Pike Creek, Pike Creek Valley, Newport, Stanton, and far eastern Newark proper. Second-term Democratic incumbent Jack Walsh, who was elected in 2020 with 67.1% of the vote, won a third term.

District 10 

The 10th district is based in Middletown, also covering Mount Pleasant, Summit Bridge, western Glasgow, and the southernmost reaches of Newark. First-term Democratic incumbent Stephanie Hansen, who was elected in 2018 with 62.1% of the vote, won a second term unopposed.

District 11 

The 11th district covers communities immediately to the east of Newark in New Castle County, including Brookside, Christiana, Woodshade, Taylortown, and some of Bear. Third-term Democratic incumbent Bryan Townsend, who was elected in 2018 with 75.8% of the vote, won a fourth term unopposed.

District 12 

The 12th district covers much of central New Castle County along the Delaware River, including Delaware City, Wrangle Hill, Williamsburg, Kirkwood, Greylag, Bayview Manor, Monterey Farms, and parts of Glasgow, Bear, New Castle, and Wilmington Manor. Third-term Democratic incumbent Nicole Poore, who was unopposed in 2020, won a fourth term.

District 13 

The 13th district covers much of unincorporated New Castle County to the south of Wilmington, including Red Lion, Monterey Farms, Fairwinds, Duross Heights, Clearvier Manor, and parts of Bear and Wilmington Manor. First-term Democratic incumbent Marie Pinkney, who was elected in 2020 with 75.8% of the vote, won a second term unopposed.

District 14 

The 14th district straddles the border between New Castle County and Kent County, covering all of Smyrna, Clayton, Odessa, Blackbird, and Leipsic, as well as parts of Middletown. Four-term Democratic incumbent Bruce Ennis, who was re-elected in 2020 with 59.5% of the vote, announced in 2021, that he would not run for re-election. Democrat Kyra Hoffner went on to win the seat in the general election.

Democratic primary

General election

District 15 

The 15th district covers much of Kent County to the west of Dover, including Cheswold, Felton, Kenton, Marydel, Hartly, Willow Grove, Petersburg, Sandtown, and part of Viola. Four-term Republican incumbent Dave Lawson, who was elected in 2020 with 55.3% of the vote, won a fifth term unopposed.

District 16 

The 16th district covers southern Dover and its suburbs in Kent County, including Highland Acres, Rising Sun-Lebanon, Kent Acres, Riverview, Magnolia, Woodside, Woodside East, Frederica, Little Creek, Bowers, and Little Heaven. Nine-term Republican incumbent Colin Bonini, who was elected in 2018 with 55% of the vote, lost the September 13th Republican Primary, finishing last place in a 3-way race. Republican Eric Buckson went on to win the general election unopposed.

Republican primary

General election

District 17 

The 17th district is based in Dover, covering most of the city proper as well as the nearby Kent County communities of Camden, Wyoming, and Rodney Village. First-term Democratic incumbent Trey Paradee, who was elected in 2018 with 64.3% of the vote, won a second term.

District 18 

The 18th district covers southern Kent County and northern Sussex County, including the communities of Milford, Harrington, Greenwood, Ellendale, Houston, Farmington, Slaughter Beach, and Lincoln. First-term Republican incumbent Dave Wilson, who was elected in 2018 with 65.2% of the vote, won a second term.

District 19 

The 19th district covers central Sussex County, including the communities of Georgetown, Bridgeville, and Long Neck. Third-term Republican incumbent Brian Pettyjohn, who was unopposed in 2020, won a fourth term unopposed.

District 20 

The 20th district is based in southeastern Sussex County along the Atlantic Ocean, including the communities of Millsboro, Selbyville, Ocean View, Bethany Beach, Dagsboro, Frankford, Fenwick Island, Millville, South Bethany, Roxana, and Oak Orchard. Third-term Republican incumbent Gerald Hocker, who was unopposed in 2020, won a fourth term unopposed.

District 21 

The 21st district is based in the southwestern corner of Sussex County, including the communities of Seaford, Laurel, Delmar, Bethel, Gumboro, and Reliance. Third-term Republican incumbent Bryant Richardson, who was elected in 2018 with 65.0% of the vote, won a fourth term.

References 

Senate
2022
Delaware House of Representatives